This is a list of Scottish football transfers featuring at least one 2015–16 Scottish Premiership club or one 2015–16 Scottish Championship club which were completed after the summer 2015 transfer window closed and before the end of the 2015–16 season.

List

See also
 List of Scottish football transfers summer 2015
 List of Scottish football transfers summer 2016

References

External links
Scottish Premiership ins and outs - January 2016, BBC Sport 
Scottish Championship ins and outs - January 2016, BBC Sport

Transfers
Scottish
2015 in Scottish sport
2016 in Scottish sport
2015 winter